Procrica ophiograpta is a species of moth of the family Tortricidae. It is found in Ethiopia and Uganda.

References

Moths described in 1932
Archipini